Teenage Time Killers is a rock supergroup formed in February 2014 by My Ruin guitarist Mick Murphy and Corrosion of Conformity drummer Reed Mullin. Guests include Dave Grohl (former drummer of Nirvana and current lead singer of the Foo Fighters), Stephen O'Malley (of Sunn O))) and Burning Witch), Corey Taylor (lead vocalist of Slipknot and founder of Stone Sour), Nick Oliveri (former bassist for Queens of the Stone Age, currently with The Dwarves), Jello Biafra (former front man of Dead Kennedys, currently with The Guantanamo School of Medicine), Matt Skiba (vocalist and guitarist of Alkaline Trio and current guitarist and vocalist for Blink-182) and Randy Blythe (lead vocalist of Lamb of God). The band's name refers to the Rudimentary Peni song of the same name. Their debut album, titled Teenage Time Killers: Greatest Hits Vol. 1, was recorded at Grohl's Studio 606, and was released July 28, 2015. through Rise Records, with whom the group signed in December 2014. The album contains a version of John Cleese's poem "Ode to Hannity," sung by Biafra. Mullin has stated that he isn't sure whether the group will tour, but that they are considering a live appearance on a show such as Jimmy Kimmel Live!, possibly with "three or four singers [coming] out at a time".

Members
Current members
Mick Murphy – guitars, bass
Past members
Reed Mullin – drums, vocals (deceased 2020)
Guests on Teenage Time Killers: Greatest Hits Vol. 1
 Dave Grohl – bass
 Greg Anderson – guitars
 Brian Baker – guitars
 Pat "Adam Bomb" Hoed – bass
 London May – drums
 Mike Schaefer – guitars
 Mike Dean – bass
 Corey Taylor – vocals
 Randy Blythe – vocals
 Matt Skiba – vocals
 Neil Fallon – vocals
 Jello Biafra – vocals
 Lee Ving – vocals
 Mike "IX" Williams – vocals
 Tommy Victor – vocals
 Karl Agell – vocals
 Pete Stahl – vocals
 Vic Bondi – vocals
 Aaron Beam – vocals
 Clifford Dinsmore – vocals
 Phil Rind – vocals
 Tairrie B – vocals
 Tony Foresta – vocals
 Trenton Rogers – vocals
 Pat Smear – guitars, bass
 Woody Weatherman – guitars
 Jim Rota – guitars
 Jason Browning – guitars
 Nick Oliveri – bass
 Jonny Webber – vocals, composing

References

Musical groups established in 2014
American supergroups
Dave Grohl
2014 establishments in California